Moisés Aldape Chávez (born 14 August 1981 in León) is a Mexican professional road bicycle racer for UCI Continental team . He was part of the Mexican squad for the 2008 Summer Olympics in Beijing, where he finished 47th in the men's road race.

Career highlights

2007
 1st overall, Vuelta a Guanajuato, Mexico
Winner Stage 2
2008
 Cascade Cycling Classic, United States
Winner Stage 5
2009
 Cascade Cycling Classic, United States
Winner Stage 4
 Tour of Missouri Mountains Classification

External links

1981 births
Living people
Mexican male cyclists
Sportspeople from León, Guanajuato
Olympic cyclists of Mexico
Cyclists at the 2008 Summer Olympics